Mpeketoni is a town in Lamu County, on the Kenyan coast. It is a settlement scheme started in 1960s by the first president of the Republic of Kenya, Jomo Kenyatta near a fresh water lake bearing his name.

Location
The coordinates of the town are: 2°23'28.0"S, 40°41'50.0"E (Latitude:-2.391119; Longitude:40.697233).

History
Originally, Mpeketoni and its surroundings were inhabited by Swahilis called Wabajuni and a small hunting and gathering  tribe by the name of Wasanye  or the Sanyes who are almost extinct. In the early 1970s Mpeketoni was transformed into a settlement area for landless Kenyans. Most of those who settled there were Kenyans from up country, largely members of the Kikuyu community who had been living in Tanzania but decided to return home because of the changing political climate. The Kikuyu tribe, which is traditionally a farming community, mostly populates this area. Other tribes found in Mpeketoni include the Luos and Kambas as well as the original local Swahili people.

The town is on a route that was used by the Arab traders taking their commodities "slaves" to Lamu Island. Up to now huge mango trees along the way from Mpeketoni to Lamu Island are still visible and are said to have grown from the seeds of the mangoes slaves were eating.

Overview
The land has since been painstakingly transformed to arable land for farming. The main cash crops include maize, cotton, cassava, cashew nuts, mangoes, and bananas.

The people of Mpeketoni have benefited from the efforts from a variety of non-profit organizations, a German not-for-profit organization GTZ and a Dutch philanthropist with ongoing charity projects since 1987. Schools, a clinic and a church have been built with funds collected from the Netherlands in collaboration with the Groen van Prinsterer school in Vlaardingen, in the Netherlands. The clinic was named Maria Teresa Nuzzo Health Centre after the foundress of the Catholic Sisters', a congregation that run it. It is now the Mpeketoni Hospital. The lake is an ecological site with variety of fish, not less than 3,500 hippos and a large array of birds.

Population
As of June 2015, the population of the town was estimated at about 50,000.

Administration
The Division is divided into small administrative villages, including Kiongwe, Baharini, Mkunumbi, Bomani, Uziwa, Mapenya, Lakeside, Kibaoni, Hongwe and Tewa.

Mpeketoni attacks 

On June 16, 2014, gunmen killed at least 48 people in a bloody attack.

See also
List of roads in Uganda

References

External links
Mpeketoni attack fits into developing scenario blaming Cord for targeting the Kikuyu

Lake Kenyatta
Populated places in Lamu County